State Route 230 (SR 230) is a  west–east state highway in the central part of the U.S. state of Georgia. It travels in a northern arc through portions of Dooly, Pulaski, and Dodge counties.

Route description
SR 230 begins at an intersection with SR 27 in the unincorporated community of Drayton, which is in southwestern Dooly County and west of Vienna. Here, the roadway continues as River Road. This was a former section of SR 230. It heads northwest along River Road, crossing Turkey Creek, until it turns northeast. Here, the "River Road" name continues to the northwest. SR 230 continues to the northeast until it reaches Byromville, where it has a brief concurrency with SR 90. It continues heading northeast, before heading east to its intersection with SR 329 northeast of the unincorporated community of Snow Spring, which is west of Unadilla. In Unadilla is an interchange with Interstate 75 (I-75) and a very brief concurrency with US 41/SR 7. East of Unadilla, the road crosses into Pulaski County. Then, it enters Hawkinsville. It has an intersection with US 129/US 341/SR 11, which begins a concurrency with all three. Farther east is an intersection with SR 27/SR 257, which both join the concurrency. A short distance later is an intersection with US 129/US 129 Alternate/SR 11/SR 11 Business/SR 112, where US 129/SR 11 leave the concurrency to the south. Just before crossing the Ocmulgee River is an intersection with US 341 Business/SR 26, where SR 26 joins the concurrency. Shortly after crossing the river, this major concurrency meets its eastern end. US 129 Alternate/SR 26/SR 112/SR 257 head to the northeast, US 341/SR 27 continue to the east, and SR 230 departs to the southeast. Farther to the southeast, SR 230 enters Dodge County. About  after the county line, it meets its eastern terminus, an intersection with SR 87.

The section that is concurrent with US 341 is the only section of SR 230 that is part of the National Highway System, a system of routes determined to be the most important for the nation's economy, mobility and defense.

History
SR 230 was established in 1944 along an alignment from SR 90 in Byromville to US 41/SR 7 in Unadilla. In 1950, this original section was paved. By 1960, the road's western terminus was extended to an intersection with US 280/SR 30 southeast of its current western terminus, and its eastern terminus was extended along its current alignment to its current eastern terminus. By 1966, it was completely paved from Drayton to its eastern terminus. By 1977, the section between US 280/SR 30 and SR 27 was decommissioned.

Major intersections

See also

References

External links

230
Transportation in Dooly County, Georgia
Transportation in Pulaski County, Georgia
Transportation in Dodge County, Georgia